A khrushchevka, also known by the derogatory nickname khrushchoba, is a type of low-cost, concrete-paneled or brick three- to five-storied apartment building which was developed in the Soviet Union during the early 1960s, during the time its namesake Nikita Khrushchev directed the Soviet government. Khrushchevkas are sometimes compared to the Japanese danchi, similar (often government-sponsored) housing projects from the same period, which by some accounts were directly inspired by them. Preceding this type of housing, the majority of the Soviet housing stock was of low-rise communal apartments.

An updated high rise version, the brezhnevka, was built in the 1970s and 1980s and included many upgrades including larger apartments (particularly, larger kitchens), elevators, and garbage disposals. This was then followed by what is known unofficially as the novostroika, meaning "new construction,". The novostroika retain the panel-house style used in the Soviet Union, but are taller, have 21st century amenities, parking, more colorful and decorative themes, and are built over a much larger area. These, however, are not government-built, instead they are built by private contractors on behalf of local governments. An example of this is Kudrovo in Leningrad Oblast, Russia

History

Traditional masonry is labor-intensive; individual projects were slow and not scalable to the needs of overcrowded cities. To ameliorate a severe housing shortage, during 1947–1951 Soviet architects evaluated various technologies attempting to reduce costs and completion time. During January 1951, an architects' convention, supervised by Khrushchev (then the party director of Moscow), declared low-cost, quick technologies the objective of Soviet architects.

Two concrete plants were later established in Moscow (Presnensky, 1953; Khoroshevsky, 1954). By this time, competing experimental designs were tested by real-life construction, and prefabricated concrete panels were considered superior. Other possibilities, like in situ concrete, or encouraging individual low-rise construction, were discarded.

During 1954–1961, engineer Vitaly Lagutenko, chief planner of Moscow since 1956, designed and tested the mass-scale, industrialized construction process, relying on concrete panel plants and a quick assembly schedule. During 1961, Lagutenko's institute released the K-7 design of a prefabricated 5-story building that became typical of the khrushchevka. 64,000 units (3,000,000 m2 or 32,000,000 sq ft) of this type were built in Moscow from 1961 to 1968. The khrushchevkas were cheap, and sometimes an entire building could be constructed within two weeks. Poor quality construction has since become a liability, leading Moscow to announce the Moscow Urban Renewal Initiative an effort to replace structures that ended their functional lives.

In Moscow, space limitations forced a switch to 9 or 12-story buildings; the last 5-story khrushchevka was completed there during 1971. The rest of the USSR continued building khrushchevkas until the fall of the Soviet Union; millions of such units are now past their design lifetime.

Design
The khrushchevka design represented an early attempt at industrialised and prefabricated building, with elements (or panels) made at concrete plants and trucked to sites as needed. Planners regarded elevators as too costly and as too time-consuming to build, and Soviet health/safety standards specified five stories as the maximum height of a building without an elevator. Thus almost all khrushchevkas have five stories.

Khrushchevkas featured combined bathrooms. They had been introduced with Ivan Zholtovsky's prize-winning Bolshaya Kaluzhskaya building, but Lagutenko continued the space-saving idea, replacing regular-sized bathtubs with 120 cm (4 ft) long "sitting baths". Completed bathroom cubicles, assembled at a Khoroshevsky plant, were trucked to the site; construction crews would lower them in place and connect the piping.

Kitchens were small, usually 6 m2 (65 sq ft). This was also common for many non-élite class Stalinist houses, some of which had dedicated dining rooms.

Typical apartments of the K-7 series have a total area of 30 m2 (323 sq ft) (one-room), 44 m2 (474 sq ft) (two-room) and 60 m2 (646 sq ft) (three-room). Later designs further reduced these meager areas.

Rooms of K-7 are "isolated", in the sense that they all connect to a small entrance hall, not to each other. Later designs (П-35, et al.) disposed with this "redundancy": residents had to pass through the living room to reach the bedroom.

Some apartments also had a storage room. In practice it often served as another bedroom, albeit one without windows or ventilation.

These apartments were planned for small families, but in reality it was not unusual for three generations of people to live together in two-room apartments.

Present day

The panel buildings called khrushchevka are found in great numbers all over the former Soviet Union. They were originally considered to be temporary housing until the housing shortage could be alleviated by mature Communism, which would not have any shortages. Khrushchev predicted the achievement of Communism in 20 years (by the 1980s). Later, Leonid Brezhnev promised each family an apartment "with a separate room for each person plus one room extra", but many people continue to live in khrushchevkas today.Khrushchevka standard types are classified into "disposable", with a planned 25-year life, and "permanent". This distinction is important in Moscow and other affluent cities, where disposable khrushchevkas are being demolished to make way for new, higher-density construction. The City of Moscow had planned to complete this process by 2015. More than 1,300 out of around 1,700 buildings had been already demolished by 2012. In 2017, Moscow city authorities announced that some 8,000 khrushchevkas would be torn down, a move that would cause 1.6 million people to lose their homes. The announcement came after the completion of a smaller demolition project in which 1,700 buildings were torn down.

In some parts of the former Soviet Union and Eastern Bloc countries, efforts to renovate and beautify khrushchevkas have been made, such as in the Czech Republic, Slovakia, and Belarus. In many cities, khrushchevkas have been transformed from drab, gray buildings to colorful housing blocks through series of renovations. In addition, efforts to improve the quality of the buildings have been made. In Tartu, Estonia, the European Union-funded SmartEnCity turned three khrushchevka blocks into energy efficient "smart homes." The renovations are usually heavily subsidized by the state, and in many cases, by the European Union if the country is a member state of the EU. In Russia, Belarus, and Central Asia these same styles of renovations have not taken place, resulting in further dilapidation of the buildings or, in some cases, the demolition of many Krushchyovkas. In these parts of the former Soviet Union, private renovation has been the norm, explaining the difference in the conditions of the buildings.

In English-speaking countries, khrushchevkas are often referred to by the slang term commieblock. Sometimes, this is sarcastically be applied to any apartment complex which is perceived as overly austere in appearance or run down regardless of whether it is located in a previously communist country or not.

In 2017, Moscow Mayor Sergei Sobyanin and Russian President Vladimir Putin announced the Moscow Urban Renewal Initiative, a vast public works program to demolish thousands of the city's Khrushchevka. The plan includes the demolition of 5,171 dilapidated khrushchevka and replacement with modern 6 to 20-story residential structures. The plan upon completion will entail the relocation of 1.6 million city residents.

Gallery

See also 

 Urban planning in communist countries
 Panelák and Sídlisko (Czech Republic and Slovakia)
 Tongzi lou and Danyuan fang (China)
 Plattenbau (Germany)
 Panelház (Hungary)
 Million Programme (Sweden)
 Affordable housing
 Public housing
 Subsidized housing
 Housing estate
 Brutalism

References

Sources

External links

 
 

Architecture in Russia
Architecture in the Soviet Union
Soviet phraseology
Nikita Khrushchev
Economy of the Soviet Union
Russian words and phrases
Buildings and structures built in the Soviet Union